Yvon Jules Labre (born November 29, 1949) is a Canadian former professional ice hockey player.
 
Labre was born in Sudbury, Ontario. He was originally drafted by the Pittsburgh Penguins, for whom he played 37 games before being selected by the Washington Capitals in the 1974 NHL Expansion Draft. Labre scored the first-ever home goal for Washington, beating the Los Angeles Kings' goaltender Rogie Vachon. Although he was never one to put up big offensive numbers, Labre's value was noted in being a hard-nosed defensive defenceman on the ice and an active member of community programs and youth hockey programs off it. Such dedication to a team in a location not known for rich hockey history made him one of the Capitals' most popular players during his time there.
 
Labre served as team captain from 1976 to 1978. He remained in the Capitals organization after his playing career ended. At various times since his retirement, he has served as an assistant coach, colour commentator, scout and the director of community relations for the Capitals. Labre's jersey number (#7) was retired by the Capitals on November 22, 1981.

Career statistics

External links
 
 Profile at hockeydraftcentral.com

1949 births
Living people
Amarillo Wranglers players
Baltimore Clippers players
Canadian ice hockey defencemen
Franco-Ontarian people
Hershey Bears players
Ice hockey people from Ontario
National Hockey League players with retired numbers
Pittsburgh Penguins draft picks
Pittsburgh Penguins players
Sportspeople from Greater Sudbury
Toronto Marlboros players
Washington Capitals captains
Washington Capitals coaches
Washington Capitals players
Canadian ice hockey coaches
Washington Capitals announcers